Musty Rusty is an album by jazz saxophonist Lou Donaldson recorded for the Cadet label in 1965 and performed by Donaldson with trumpeter  Bill Hardman, organist Billy Gardner, guitarist Grant Green, and drummer Ben Dixon.

Reception

The album was awarded 4 stars and the Allmusic review by Jason Ankeny states "Musty Rusty follows in much the same vein as Lou Donaldson's previous LPs for Blue Note... Donaldson originals like "Hippity Hop" and the title tune crackle with energy, and the melodic ingenuity of Green's guitar solos astounds".

Track listing 
All compositions by Lou Donaldson except where noted
 "Musty Rusty" - 6:06
 "Midnight Sun" (Sonny Burke, Lionel Hampton, Johnny Mercer) - 4:48
 "Hipty Hop" - 5:20
 "The Space Walk" (Ben Dixon) - 6:10
 "Ha' Mercy" - 5:24
 "Cherry Pink (and Apple Blossom White)" (Louis Guglielmi) - 5:24

Personnel 
 Lou Donaldson - alto saxophone
 Bill Hardman - trumpet
 Grant Green - guitar
 Billy Gardner - Hammond B3 organ
 Ben Dixon - drums

References 

Lou Donaldson albums
1965 albums
Albums produced by Esmond Edwards
Albums recorded at Van Gelder Studio
Argo Records albums